MSC Messina is a Liberian-flagged container ship. The ship is operated by Mediterranean Shipping Company which is the second largest container operator in the world. It was built in 1995.

Fire 
On 24 June 2021, the ship caught fire in the midway of the Indian Ocean halfway between Sri Lanka and Malacca Strait. The fire in incident took place when the ship departed from the Colombo Port to Singapore with around 28 crew members on board. It was revealed that the ship arrived to Sri Lanka on 22 June 2021. On 26 June 2021, the fire was brought under control by the crew members of the ship by using carbon dioxide to douse the fire. The Indian Coast Guard came to the rescue immediately as it deployed one of its ships and aircraft to provide assistance to the container ship during the rescue operations. At least one crew member was reportedly missing during the fire incident and search operations began. On 27 June 2021, the ship departed to Singapore once the fire was successful extinguished from the engine room.

References 

Maritime incidents in 2021
Container ships
2021 in Sri Lanka
June 2021 events in Asia
Environmental disasters in Asia
Ship fires
Shipwrecks in the Indian Ocean
2021 fires in Asia
2021 disasters in Asia
1995 ships